Matty Blythe (born 20 November 1988) is an English former professional rugby league footballer who played in the 2000s and 2010s.

Playing career

Warrington Wolves
Blythe's career began with the Warrington club in 2007.

Bradford Bulls
In 2013 Blythe was loaned out to Super League side the Bradford Bulls for the 2013 Bradford Bulls season. Blythe played in the pre-season friendlies against Dewsbury and Leeds.

The following year, he featured in six consecutive games from the commencement of the season. He then missed a large chunk of games through injury. Blythe returned and featured in Round 14 Leeds to Round 21 Wigan and also in the Challenge Cup against London Broncos. Blythe scored seven tries in the regular season that year, which included a brace against Salford City Reds. He signed a permanent three-year deal with the Bradford club towards the back end of the 2014season.

Blythe missed Rounds 1–5 due to injury. He featured in Round 6 (Hull Kingston Rovers) to Round 9 Leeds. He was injured for Rounds 10–14. Blythe played in Round 15 (Wakefield Trinity Wildcats) to Round 20 (St Helens R.F.C.) then in Round 22 Wigan to Round 26 (Widnes). He also featured in Round 4 (Oldham) and in the Quarter Final (Warrington) in the Challenge Cup.

Blythe featured in Round 17 Dewsbury  Round 23 (Halifax). Blythe played in Qualifier 1 (Sheffield) to Qualifier 4 (Widnes) then in Qualifier 7 (Halifax). Blythe played in the £1 Million Game (Wakefield Trinity Wildcats). He scored against the Batley side (2 tries), the Hunslet Hawks (1 try), Leigh (3 tries) and the Wakefield Trinity Wildcats (1 try). However, the Bradford side were relegated to the Kingstone Press Championship by Wakefield Trinity club in the £1 Million Game.

Blythe featured in both pre-season friendlies against Leeds and Castleford Tigers before the 2016 Bradford Bulls season.

He featured in Round 1 (Featherstone Rovers) to Round 4 (Leigh) then in Round 6 (Bailey) to Round 7 (London Broncos). Blythe played in round 13 (Swinton Lions) to round 15 (Leigh Centurions) then in round 19 (Halifax) to round 21 (Whitehaven). He played in round 23 (Featherstone Rovers). Blythe featured in the Championship Shield Game 1 (Whitehaven) to Game 2 (Halifax). Blythe played in the Challenge Cup in the fourth round Dewsbury.

Return to Warrington Wolves
At the end of the season Blythe signed a one-year deal with former club Warrington. He managed to get three games in 2017's Super League XXII, against Castleford Tigers, Wigan and Salford, all three games were lost. Blythe was loaned out to Rochdale Hornets of the Kingstone Press Championship on dual registration where he played twice against Halifax and the Sheffield Eagles. He announced his retirement having been released by Warrington outfit.

Statistics

References

External links
Profile at warringtonwolves.com

1988 births
Living people
Bradford Bulls players
English rugby league players
Leigh Leopards players
People from Irlam
Rochdale Hornets players
Rugby league centres
Rugby league locks
Rugby league players from Salford
Rugby league second-rows
Rugby league wingers
Warrington Wolves players